Oberikha is a rural locality (a village) in Komyanskoye Rural Settlement, Gryazovetsky District, Vologda Oblast, Russia. The population was 2 as of 2002.

Geography 
Oberikha is located 33 km northeast of Gryazovets (the district's administrative centre) by road. Nizovka is the nearest rural locality.

References 

Rural localities in Gryazovetsky District